Jean-Charles Flipart (1682–1751) was a French engraver. He was born in Paris. His sons Charles-Joseph and Jean-Jacques Flipart were engravers and the former, also a painter.

Among his plates are: 
Portrait of René Choppin, after Jannet
Virgin and Child, after Raphael
Christ praying on the Mount of Olives, after the same
Penitent Magdalen, after Charles Le Brun
Apollo and Daphne, after René-Antoine Houasse

Gallery

References

External links
Bénézit (Oxford Art Online) (subscription only)

1682 births
1751 deaths
18th-century engravers
French engravers
Catholic engravers